Bil Herd is a computer engineer who created several designs for 8-bit home computers while working for Commodore Business Machines in the early to mid-1980s.

Biography 
He attended the Indiana school system. Herd did not have a college degree, and did not graduate high school, though he was working as an engineer by the age of 20.

Military service 
Military service:
 1977–1980: 238th Cavalry - 38th Division Indiana Army National Guard
 1980–1982: 103rd Medical Battalion - 28th Division Pennsylvania Army National Guard
 1981: Army Commendation Medal for meritorious service.

Working for Commodore 
After first acting as the principal engineer on the Commodore Plus/4, C16/116, C264, and C364 machines, Herd designed the significantly more successful Commodore 128, a dual-CPU, triple-OS, compatible successor to the Commodore 64. Prior to the C128, Herd had done the initial architecture of the Commodore LCD computer, which was not released.

After Commodore 
After leaving Commodore, Herd continued to design faster and more powerful computers with emphasis on machine vision and is a co-author on a patent involving n-dimensional pattern matching.  He also designed an ultrasonic backup sensor for vehicles while working for Indian Valley Mfg. in 1986, a feature found on many modern vehicles today.

Voluntary health care work:

 1989–1996: Fellowship First Aid Squad / Mount Laurel EMS Inc. Highest rank: Captain (also served as president)
 1991–1995: Cooper Trauma Center - Camden, NJ: Trauma Technician

Herd has undertaken an entrepreneurial role and is owner of several small companies. As for recent low-level computer hacking, he did a "cameo appearance" by contributing a snippet of sprite logic code to the C64 DTV product designed by Jeri Ellsworth.

Herd appeared in and narrated the documentary "Growing the 8 Bit Generation" (a.k.a. "The Commodore Wars") about the early days of Commodore and the home computers explosion. Subsequently, he narrated the documentary "Easy to learn, hard to master: the fate of Atari", thus becoming the official voice of the "8-bit Generation" documentary series.  he produces videos for Hackaday.

In 2021, Herd co-authored a book with Margaret Morabito, Back into the Storm: A Design Engineer's Story of Commodore Computers in the 1980s, in which he recounts inside stories about his and his team's experiences with designing computers for Commodore.

References

Bagnall, Brian: On The Edge: The Spectacular Rise and Fall of Commodore, .

 Greenley, Larry, et al. (1986). Commodore 128 Programmer's Reference Guide.  . (Herd Co-author)
Herd, B. & Morabito, M. (2021).  Back into the Storm: A Design Engineer's Story of Commodore Computers in the 1980s. .

External links 

The 8 Bit Generation The story of Jack Tramiel and Commodore International Produced by JunkFood, narrated by Bil Herd
Hackaday.com – Bil Herd's Original Videos at Hackaday
Commodore 128 History at Commodore.ca – by Ian Matthews
A brief history of the computer demo scene – By Tamás Polgár
The C128 story, by Bil Herd – at Fab's Commodore page (Fabian Meyer)
C128.com Commodore Users Group Video - Updated 2005 – With Bil Herd, Dave Haynie
Appearance on The Linux Link Tech Show on September 12, 2007 (ogg) (mp3)
Two videos of Bil Herd at the 25th Anniversary of the Commodore 64 at the Computer History Museum in 2007
A video of Bil Herd and Dale Luck post-show at the 25th Anniversary of the Commodore 64 at the Computer History Museum in 2007
C128.com video of Bil Herd describing the C116 TED family of computers under Jack Tramiel
Video of Bil Herd and Jeri Ellsworth explaining Phase Locked Loops
Commodore History Part 5 - The C128

Commodore people
Computer hardware engineers
Living people
Year of birth missing (living people)